Wu of Qin may refer to:

Duke Wu of Qin (died 678 BC)
King Wu of Qin (329–307 BC)